Ling Ao Nuclear Power Plant is located on the Dapeng Peninsula in Longgang District, Shenzhen, Guangdong, China, about 60 km north of Hong Kong, 1 km north of Daya Bay Nuclear Power Plant. It is operated by China General Nuclear Power Group.  The units on site are separated between phase I and phase II.

Reactors 

Ling Ao phase I has two nuclear reactors, 950 MWe PWRs Ling Ao I-1 and I-2, based on the French 900 MWe three cooling loop design (M310), which started commercial operation in 2002 and 2003. The planned investment sum for phase I was ca 4 billion USD.

In a Phase II development two CPR-1000 reactors, Ling Ao II-1 and II-2 (alternatively, units 3 and 4), were constructed in conjunction with Areva, based on the French three cooling loop design. Ling Ao II-1, China’s first domestic CPR-1000 nuclear power plant, was first connected to the grid on 15 July 2010, having started criticality testing on 11 June 2010.  It started commercial operations on 27 September 2010.  Ling Ao II-2 was synchronized to the grid on May 3, 2011, with commercial operation beginning on August 7, 2011.

Reactor data
The Ling Ao Nuclear Power Plant consist of 4 operational reactors.

See also 

Nuclear power in China

References

External links 
Daya Bay and Ling Ao Power Plants Has a satellite map.

Nuclear power stations using CPR-1000 reactors
Nuclear power stations in China
Buildings and structures in Guangdong
Energy infrastructure completed in 2002
Nuclear power stations with proposed reactors
2002 establishments in China